Southwestern Advantage, formerly known as Southwestern Company, is an education material sales company based in Nashville, TN. Established in 1855, the privately-owned company recruits college and university students as independent contractors to sell educational books, apps, and website subscriptions door-to-door using direct selling methods. Southwestern Advantage is part of the Southwestern family of companies.

History 
Founded in 1889, by a Baptist minister Southwestern Advantage was established as a company for veterans of the Civil War to sell books door-to-door to receive income in the post-war economy.

Program 
Every year, the company recruits American and European university students to work as independent contractors who sell educational books, software, and subscription websites during the summer months. Students who accept a position complete a free, week-long training program in Nashville, Tennessee. After completing the program, students are assigned a position outside of their home or school states, and are typically responsible for housing costs of about $50/week, usually living with a host family. Sales areas are predominantly suburban or rural.

The company operates on a direct sales platform, where wages are solely determined by sales revenue minus expenses and costs of goods sold; they do not offer employee benefits or guaranteed pay. Students are responsible for their expenses (like food and gas) while operating in the field during the selling season, and foreign students must pay for their visas and airfare themselves. Some universities consider the program an internship eligible for college credits.

The commission rate for most dealers is 40%. Some students report working 80 hours a week or more during selling season, though minimum quotas are not mandated by Southwestern. Attendance to weekly Sunday meetings with managers are also not mandatory, but if a meeting space is rented, dealers are encouraged to pay $10–20 each to share expenses.

If a permit is required for door-to-door sales, Southwestern reimburses dealers for 50% of the cost above $5.

In 2019, student dealers represented over 240 college and university campuses around the world.

Working conditions and income
Students typically have a host family near their sales area, generally alumni, family of other students, or families found by door-to-door appeals. Housing is not guaranteed by the company.

Dealers - who work as independent contractors - report working 72 or more hours per week in the field, making 30 or more presentations each day, in addition to time spent on bookkeeping, talking to managers or at sales meetings held each Sunday. According to the company, in 2010 the average first-year dealer who stayed with the program for over 20 days grossed $2,415 per month before expenses, which usually range from $1,500 to $3,000.

At the end of the summer, products are shipped to the dealers, who revisit the homes where they made a sale to deliver the product and collect any balance due. Dealers generally pay their living expenses out of the down payments they collect, remitting the rest to the company to cover wholesale costs. Dealers return to headquarters in Nashville, where they settle accounts and receive a check for the season's earnings. Some dealers are invited to return in subsequent years as managers, who recruit their own teams during the school year and earn a percentage commission on the sales of their team.

Products
Southwestern Advantage publishes and markets educational books, software, and subscription websites. The main product, Southwestern Advantage, is a series of educational reference books targeted to school-age children. The product line also includes apps, college prep material, and others.

Controversies

Lobbying 
In 2007, Southwestern Advantage lobbied against the Malinda's Traveling Sales Crew Protection Act, an anti-traveling sales crew bill intended to stop companies from putting their workers in dangerous and unfair conditions. The bill was passed, but in a form that applies only to sales workers who travel in groups of two or more.

Bans from campuses 
Harvard University banned Southwestern from recruiting on its campus in 1977 for "irregular recruiting activities", though four years later Southwestern resumed recruiting despite this ban. In 2005, the University of Maryland banned Southwestern from recruiting on its campus; as of 2009, however, the University continued to receive complaints against the company.

In the UK University of Durham's campus in 2005, the Durham Students' Union, stating that the "Southwestern Company 'experience' is not marketed as openly as it could be, and some students may be misled", banned Southwestern from Dunelm House and mandated the union president "to liaise with Southwestern Books to work towards marketing which is clearer and to ask the company to develop its recruitment process to ensure Durham students are aware of the risks and pressures that the job entails."

The Guild of Students at the University of Birmingham passed a motion in May 2006 banning the company from its premises and encouraging the University to do the same.

In 2010, the University of Idaho announced that Southwestern Advantage is prohibited from recruiting on campus due to misconduct and violation of University and Career Center policies after several complaints were issued, which were deemed "valid" by the campus' career center director. She explained, "I don't really think students understand the implications of an independent contractor," referring the company policy of registering student employees as independent contractors.

A non-binding motion was passed at the 2010 AGM of the Students Association at the University of Edinburgh, banning the company from all union premises.

Proposals to ban from campuses 
In 2020, controversy arose at Purdue University after the company visited the school in order to pitch to students. One sophomore on campus initiated a petition to ban the company from campus, which received over 120 signatures.

References

External links
 

Companies based in Nashville, Tennessee
Personal selling
Publishing companies established in 1855
1855 establishments in Tennessee
Direct sales companies
Publishing companies of the United States
Educational materials
Education companies established in the 19th century